QUED may refer to:
 QUED/M, text editor
 QueD (gene) or 6-carboxytetrahydropterin synthase, an enzyme
 Qued Charter Elementary School, now the Barack Obama Charter School

People with the name
 Qued Koi

See also
 Que (disambiguation)
 Qued-Zen, a concentration and internment camp connected to the Laconia incident
 Queue (disambiguation)
 Quid (disambiguation)